The Global Gateway Initiative is a worldwide strategy by the European Union to invest in infrastructure projects and establish economic partnerships, based on certain principles. The project was initiated by the EU Commission, under the leadership of Ursula von der Leyen. It is part of the current plans for European strategic autonomy, and establishing bigger, more democratic and more sustainable trade networks for Europe and its partners. The initiative is also seen as an alternative or rivalry to the Chinese Belt and Road Initiative, which EU leaders heavily criticised because of human rights abuse concerns and economic risks, disadvantages and a one-sided trade relation. The EU wants to encourage links, and not dependencies, according to Ursula von der Leyen. As of December 2022, Global Gateway has been criticized for failing to provide concrete details on projects and drawing heavily on already-existing programmes.

Objectives 
As part of its trade relations, the EU sees Global Gateway as an opportunity to trade and invest in global partners better. The initiative also is a response to a longer systemic rivalry between NATO, the European Union, the US an other closely related G7 States against the People's Republic of China, made to counter increasing Chinese political and economical influence. At the 47th G7 summit, the leaders agreed on starting investment initiatives to counter the Belt and Road Initiative, with demands for inventions in the hundreds of billions. The Statement by the G7 on partnership for infrastructure and investment resembles the approach and goals of the Global Gateway Initiative. Another reason for the proposed investments is the worsening of Climate Change, a issue which the EU sees as very important to tackle. Thus, the Initiative was described as "European Green Deal Worldwide", as a reference to the EU's European Green Deal and intensification of the fight through this mechanism.

Financing 
The main funding will mostly be contributed by the EU and Member State institutions for development and finances, but also the European Investment Bank and the European Bank for Reconstruction and Development, but will also leverage private investments from the Pre-Accession Assistance (IPA) III, Interreg, InvestEU and Horizon Europe. A European Export Credit Facility is being considered for establishment, to empower European companies in third countries where they have to face strong disadvantages.

Specific funding programmes are NDICI-Global Europe (Budget: €79billion) with the EFSD+ as its financial arm, backed by the Union's External Action Guarantee (EAG) with a budget of €40billion (out of a total of €53.4 billion) to decrease the risk of investments.

In total, the EFSD+ will provide €135 billion in investments guaranteed by the External Action Guarantee for Global Gateway projects, with up to €18 billion in grants and a further planned and estimated €145 billion in investment volumes by European financial and development institutions.

Approximately half of the anticipated €300 billion funds Global Gateway funds are to be raised via private investments that the EU hopes to generate with a system of financial guarantees.

Projects 
In December 2022, the EU held a €387,000 virtual gala in the Metaverse to promote the Global Gateway project. Six people attended.

Outlook 
In 2021 comments on the Initiative, Ursula von der Leyen stated that the 6th European Union–African Union Summit would be the first case test for the Initiative, calling it a "flagship project". Other mentioned regions which are viable for funding and further partnership are Japan and India, as well as the Western Balkans, the Eastern Partnership, and the Southern Neighbourhood, but also Central Asia and Latin America.

Cooperation 
Close partnership is planned with the American Build Back Better initiative, which has similar goals. Both ventures will reinforce and support each other.

Criticism  
A report by the South China Morning Post in December 2022 states that concrete details on potential projects are difficult to find, and that the EU has instead published high-level summaries of potential projects it would like to do. Specific projects cited by as part of Global Gateway include projects for which funds were already appropriated rather than new funding. According to policy fellow W. Gyude Moore of the Center for Global Development, Global Gateway "draws heavily on existing programmes and initiatives that would have moved forward even if Global Gateway did not exist" and the project "has not gone beyond just words."

See also
Build Back Better World
Partnership for Global Infrastructure and Investment

References 

Initiatives